Choline theophyllinate (INN), also known as oxtriphylline, is a cough medicine derived from xanthine that acts as a bronchodilator to open up airways in the lung. Chemically, it is a salt of choline and theophylline. It classifies as an expectorant. The drug is available under the brand names Choledyl and Choledyl SA, among others.

References

Antitussives
Adenosine receptor antagonists
Phosphodiesterase inhibitors